Fleury-sur-Andelle is a commune in the Eure department, in the region of Normandy, northern France.

Population

International relations
It is twinned with East Goscote, Leicestershire.

See also
Communes of the Eure department

References

Communes of Eure